William Henry Lewis (October 15, 1904 – October 24, 1977) was a Major League Baseball catcher.

After his playing days ended, he spent the rest of his life as a scout, first for the St. Louis Cardinals and later for the New York Mets.

External links

Lewis played for the Independence Producers in 1930.  On April 28, 1930 the Producers played the first Night game in the history of Organized Baseball.

1904 births
1977 deaths
Augusta Wolves players
Baseball players from Tennessee
Blackwell Gassers players
Boston Bees players
Boston Braves players
Chattanooga Lookouts players
Corinth Corinthians players
Greensboro Patriots players
Hattiesburg Hubman players
Independence Producers players
Indianapolis Indians players
Knoxville Smokies players
Laredo Oilers players
Louisville Colonels (minor league) players
Major League Baseball catchers
Mobile Bears players
Montreal Royals players
People from Ripley, Tennessee
Rochester Red Wings players
St. Louis Cardinals players
St. Louis Cardinals scouts
St. Paul Saints (AA) players
Springfield Midgets players
Vicksburg Hill Billies players
Wichita Falls Spudders players